Jack Byrne (June 2, 1951 – June 4, 2008) was a Canadian politician. He represented the riding of Cape St. Francis in the Newfoundland and Labrador House of Assembly. He was a member of the Progressive Conservatives.

Politics
Formerly the mayor of Logy Bay-Middle Cove-Outer Cove from 1986 to 1993, he was first elected to the House in the 1993 provincial election representing the district of St. John's East Extern. He moved to the redistricted riding of Cape St. Francis in the 1996 election, and represented that district until his death.

He served as Minister of Municipal Affairs from 2003 to 2007 and from 2007 till his death he served as Deputy Speaker of the Newfoundland and Labrador House of Assembly.

He won five consecutive elections (1993, 1996, 1999, 2003, 2007)

Byrne had been treated during the 1990s for a tumour on his pituitary gland and died on June 5, 2008.

Arena
On October 24, 2008, the Jack Byrne Arena opened in Torbay, Newfoundland and Labrador with an appreciation night dedicated to Jack Byrne, his wife Bridget and son Matthew dropped the first puck in the new stadium for a hockey game between Torbay and Bell Island.

Electoral record

|-

|Progressive Conservative
|Jack Byrne
|align="right"|4,983
|align="right"|77.83%
|align="right"|+6.7
|-

|Liberal
|Bill Tapper
|align="right"|739
|align="right"|11.54%
|align="right"|-4.89
|-

|NDP
|Kathleen Connors
|align="right"|680
|align="right"|10.62%
|align="right"|-1.82
|-
!align="left" colspan=3|Total
!align="right"|6,402
!align="right"|
!align="right"|

|-

|Progressive Conservative
|Jack Byrne
|align="right"|5604
|align="right"|71.13%
|align="right"|+9.47
|-

|Liberal
|Bill Tapper
|align="right"|1294
|align="right"|16.43%
|align="right"|-15.43
|-

|NDP
|Ralph Tapper
|align="right"|980
|align="right"|12.44%
|align="right"|+5.98
|}

|-

|Progressive Conservative
|Jack Byrne
|align="right"|4197
|align="right"|61.66%
|align="right"|+10.57
|-

|Liberal
|Jim Martin
|align="right"|2169
|align="right"|31.86%
|align="right"|-17.05
|-

|NDP
|Shawn Sullivan
|align="right"|440
|align="right"|6.46%
|align="right"|+6.46
|}

|-

|Progressive Conservative
|Jack Byrne
|align="right"|3299
|align="right"|51.09%
|align="right"|
|-

|Liberal
|Jim Martin
|align="right"|3158
|align="right"|48.91%
|align="right"|
|}

References

1951 births
2008 deaths
Progressive Conservative Party of Newfoundland and Labrador MHAs
Mayors of places in Newfoundland and Labrador
21st-century Canadian politicians